Preston Football Club may refer to

 Preston Football Club (VFA), also known as Northern Bullants or Northern Blues; former Victorian Football Association and Victorian Football League team, Australia
 Preston Lions FC, Australia
 West Preston Lakeside Football Club, Australia
 Preston North End F.C., an English football club located in Preston, Lancashire, formed in 1863
 East Preston F.C., English club
 Preston Athletic F.C., Scottish club